The standard acceleration due to gravity (or standard acceleration of free fall), sometimes abbreviated as standard gravity, usually denoted by  or , is the nominal gravitational acceleration of an object in a vacuum near the surface of the Earth. This value was established by the 3rd CGPM (1901, CR 70) and used to define the standard weight of an object as the product of its mass and this nominal acceleration. The acceleration of a body near the surface of the Earth is due to the combined effects of gravity and centrifugal acceleration from the rotation of the Earth (but the latter is small enough to be negligible for most purposes); the total (the apparent gravity) is about 0.5% greater at the poles than at the Equator.

Although the symbol  is sometimes used for standard gravity,  (without a suffix) can also mean the local acceleration due to local gravity and centrifugal acceleration, which varies depending on one's position on Earth (see Earth's gravity). The  is also used as a unit for any form of acceleration, with the value defined as above; see g-force.

The value of  defined above is a nominal midrange value on Earth, originally based on the acceleration of a body in free fall at sea level at a geodetic latitude of 45°. Although the actual acceleration of free fall on Earth varies according to location, the above standard figure is always used for metrological purposes. In particular, since it is the ratio of the kilogram-force and the kilogram, its numeric value when expressed in coherent SI units is the ratio of the kilogram-force and the newton, two units of force.

History 
Already in the early days of its existence, the International Committee for Weights and Measures (CIPM) proceeded to define a standard thermometric scale, using the boiling point of water. Since the boiling point varies with the atmospheric pressure, the CIPM needed to define a standard atmospheric pressure. The definition they chose was based on the weight of a column of mercury of 760 mm. But since that weight depends on the local gravity, they now also needed a standard gravity. The 1887 CIPM meeting decided as follows:

All that was needed to obtain a numerical value for standard gravity was now to measure the gravitational strength at the International Bureau. This task was given to Gilbert Étienne Defforges of the Geographic Service of the French Army. The value he found, based on measurements taken in March and April 1888, was 9.80991(5) m⋅s−2.

This result formed the basis for determining the value still used today for standard gravity. The third General Conference on Weights and Measures, held in 1901, adopted a resolution declaring as follows:

Conversions

See also 
 Gravity of Earth
 Seconds pendulum
 Theoretical gravity

References 

Physical quantities
Gravity
Units of acceleration